Shara Venegas (born September 18, 1992) is a Puerto Rican volleyball player. She is a member of the Puerto Rico women's national volleyball team and played for Criollas de Caguas in 2014. Venegas made her debut with the national team at the 2009 Women's NORCECA Volleyball Championship that was held in Bayamón, Puerto Rico. She was part of the Puerto Rican National Team at the 2014 FIVB Volleyball Women's World Championship in Italy.

Clubs
  Llaneras de Toa Baja (2009-2011)
  Pinkin de Corozal (2012)
  Criollas de Caguas (2013-2017)
  Vôlei Bauru (2017-)

Notes

1992 births
Living people
People from Toa Baja, Puerto Rico
Puerto Rican women's volleyball players
Place of birth missing (living people)
Volleyball players at the 2016 Summer Olympics
Liberos
Summer Olympics competitors for Puerto Rico